Players and pairs who neither have high enough rankings nor receive wild cards may participate in a qualifying tournament held one week before the annual Wimbledon Tennis Championships.

In 2015, the qualifiers were: Laura Siegemund, Aliaksandra Sasnovich, Xu Yifan, Sachia Vickery, Margarita Gasparyan, Richèl Hogenkamp, Olga Govortsova, Duan Yingying, Tamira Paszek, Petra Cetkovská, Bethanie Mattek-Sands and Hsieh Su-wei.

This was the first Grand Slam appearance for Grand Slam champion Naomi Osaka of Japan.

Seeds

Qualifiers

Qualifying draw

First qualifier

Second qualifier

Third qualifier

Fourth qualifier

Fifth qualifier

Sixth qualifier

Seventh qualifier

Eighth qualifier

Ninth qualifier

Tenth qualifier

Eleventh qualifier

Twelfth qualifier

References 
 Qualifying draw
2015 Wimbledon Championships – Women's draws and results at the International Tennis Federation

Women's Singles Qualifying
Wimbledon Championship by year – Women's singles qualifying
Wimbledon Championships